Education in Serbia is divided into preschool (predškolsko), primary school (osnovna škola), secondary school (srednja škola) and higher education levels. It is regulated by the Ministry of Education, Science and Technological Development of the Republic of Serbia.

The Human Rights Measurement Initiative (HRMI) finds that Serbia is fulfilling only 88.9% of what it should be fulfilling for the right to education based on the country's level of income. HRMI breaks down the right to education by looking at the rights to both primary education and secondary education. While taking into consideration Serbia's income level, the nation is achieving 84.7% of what should be possible based on its resources (income) for primary education and 93.0% for secondary education.

History of education 
The beginnings of education in Serbia date from 11th and 12th century with the establishment of schools at Roman Catholic monasteries in Titel and Bač in today's Vojvodina, which was then part of the Kingdom of Hungary. People were also educated in Serbian Orthodox monasteries like Sopoćani, Studenica and Patriarchate of Peć.

After the fall of medieval Serbian state, among newly established schools were Slavic and Latin schools. In 1778, Serbian primary school Norma was established in Sombor. In 1791, Gymnasium of Karlovci, the oldest Serbian gymnasium, was established.

During the First Serbian Uprising, Belgrade Higher School was established in 1808. In 1838, in Kragujevac, Liceum of Serbian Principality was established. It was moved to Belgrade in 1841. In 1863, it merged into the Belgrade Higher School. It had 3 faculties: philosophy, engineering and law. Later, it became the University of Belgrade.

University of Belgrade was established in 1905. After World War II, more universities were established, including University of Novi Sad (1960), University of Niš (1965), University of Pristina (1969), University of Montenegro (1974) and University of Kragujevac (1976). In 2006, the State University of Novi Pazar was established.

Historical system (prior to 2005)

Educational system 
Before 2005, (the implementation of the Bologna Process and comprehensive educational reform), Serbia implemented the system from the Socialist Federative Republic of Yugoslavia. Preschool education was optional and primary and secondary education were the same. As of school year 2005–2006, the previous Diploma visokog obrazovanja (Higher Education Diploma) has been equalized with Master's degree, and Magister with the two years of doctoral studies (one year until doctorate) (because of the same length). Quaternary education was abolished and its contents were moved to tertiary education.

Professional qualification 
Historical system ranked students by professional qualification (stručna sprema). Those who graduated only from primary school were qualified as unqualified workers (nekvalifikovani radnik), while those who graduated gymnasium were semi-qualified workers (polukvalifikovani radnik).

Those with a professional high school degree had secondary professional qualification (srednja stručna sprema), those with a college ('higher school') degree had higher professional qualification (viša stručna sprema), while those with a university degree had high professional degree (visoka stručna sprema).

Degrees of professionality 
Other than professional qualification ranking that indicated workers' ability to work, there also were degrees of professionality (stepen stručne spreme). Those who graduated gymnasiums had the IV degree (reserved for four-year professional schools). The degrees were:

 I degree - Lower grades of primary school (4 years for degree; 4 years in total)
 II degree - Higher grades of primary school (4 years for degree; 8 years in total)
 III degree - Three-year professional school (3 years for degree; 11 years in total)
 IV degree - Four-year professional school (4 years for degree; 12 years in total)
 V degree - Four-year professional school (4 years for degree; 12 years in total)
 VI degree - College or Higher School (3 years for degree; 15 years in total)
 VII1 degree - University ( Visoko obrazovanje) (4-5 years for degree; 16-17 years in total)
 VII2 degree - Magistracy (2 years for degree; 19 years in total)
 VIII degree - Doctorate/PhD (1 year for degree; 20 years in total)

Compulsory Education

School Organization 
Students are organized into classes (odeljenje) of at least 5 for preschools and at least 15 for primary and secondary schools.

In primary school, a class usually consists of 15-30 students. The students belonging to the class are randomly chosen a few weeks before they start attending the 1st grade. Class structure remains unchanged for the next eight years (with a couple of exceptions). 

Most primary and high schools have their Student council (đački savet/parlament) and Peer Team (vršnjački tim).

Student councils propose events and improvements and give their opinion about particular subjects to school principals, while Peer Teams deal with students' problems (helping lower ability students learn or helping someone integrate into peer groups) with the help of professional psychologist. In schools without Peer teams, its actions are all on the psychologist.

Parents are organized into Parent councils (savet roditelja). Parent councils propose excursions, watch over actions involving students' money and debate about events happening in school. In schools without Student council, Parent council solely practices all aforementioned actions.

School Stages

Preschool education 
As of school year 2006–2007, preschool in duration of 6 months is compulsory and it is the first part of compulsory education. Attended at the age of 5 or 6 in the local kindergarten, it familiarizes students with the educational system. 

Preschool education is attended from the beginning of the year (in the same year when the 1st grade starts). It lasts for at least 4 hours a day for at least 6 months. After it, students have to pass an exam of ability in order to attend primary school.

Primary education 

Children enroll in primary schools at the age of seven (usually, all students in a class were born in the same year). However, it is possible for students to enroll at the primary school one year earlier if they were born before March.

The elementary school is divided into two stages:
Lower grades (grades 1-4)
Higher grades (grades 5-8)

In the lower grades, students are sorted into classes randomly and have only one teacher and classroom for all subjects, except for English, P.E. and, civics or religion which are taught by separate teachers.

The teacher that teaches lower grade primary school students has only one class of students assigned to them and remains with the class for 4 years.

In the higher grades, students get a whole new range of teachers and classrooms for each subject. Teachers don't change over the years; they remain the same for the next four years. In the 5th grade, each class is assigned The Head Teacher, who is responsible for students in the particular class. 

Starting grade 1, the school shift changes every 2 weeks. Starting September, students begin attending school in the morning, usually from 7:30AM to 12:40PM. After 2 weeks, students would attend school in the afternoon, usually from 1PM to 6:10PM. This method has been in use since the 20th century, but is not used on all schools, in fact, this method was mostly used in 2020 due to the COVID-19 pandemic.

When students graduate from the primary school, they choose whether they want to continue their education or not. National Strategy for Education plans to make secondary education compulsory by 2020. The Minister of Education, Žarko Obradović, said that even though strategy would be implemented in the future, it required constitutional changes.

The school year for primary and high schools lasts for 9½ months, except for 8th grade of primary and 3rd/4th grade of secondary school, for which it lasts 9 months. It begins on the first weekday of September, and ends in the half of June (June 15 ±5 days). For 8th grade of primary and 3rd/4th grade of secondary school, it ends in the beginning of June (about one week earlier than for others).

The school year is split into 2 semesters (polugodište), and semesters are split into 2 quarters (tromesečje).

Students have 6 holidays a school year: one in November (quarter holiday, lasts for 2 days), one in January (New Year/Orthodox Christmas, lasts for about 10 days), two in February (Serbia National Day, lasts for 2 days; semester holiday, lasts for about 15 days), one in April (Orthodox Easter/quarter holiday, lasts for about 10 days) and one in May (International Workers' Day, lasts for 2 days).

Between school years, in summer, there is summer holiday which last for 2½ months (3 months for those proceeding to high school or university. So, students have about 85 working days in the first semester and 95 in the second semester; 180 in total).

Throughout a school year, there are 2 voluntary school running races (kros) - one in September and one in May. In some places, there are sports competitions in Volleyball, Basketball, Soccer, Handball, Athletics, Gymnastics and Judo every year.

School Subjects

Secondary education 

Secondary schools are divided into three types - gymnasiums, professional and craft schools. After graduating from the primary school, students take a test called matura (lat. maturare). The test covers subjects that were taught in primary school. They are awarded the maximum of 40 points at the test. They also get points from their average marks from 5th to 8th grade, and the maximum is 60 points. Both the points from matura and from average marks are totallized into the maximum of 100 points. Then, students make a list of their preferred schools and courses, and are sorted according to how many points they had gained - every secondary school has a limited number of students it takes and a minimum number of points for needed for enrolling. After students make lists for preferred schools, they get into the first school that suits them according to the points. If they fail to get into any of the schools they had listed (ex. if they don't have enough points, but they had chosen very competitive schools), they make another list for the Second Enrollment Deadline.

There are secondary schools that don't require the classical point system for entrance. Various music, science, philology and ballet schools sort students out based on their talent and skill, rather than their previous academic performance.

Gymnasiums 
Gymnasiums (gimnazija) take four years to complete and offer general and broad education, awarding students a High school diploma. Students are advised to continue their education after graduation as it is very hard to find a job with a gymnasium diploma. There are also four types of special gymnasiums: The Gymnasium of Mathematics, The Gymnasium of Physics, The Gymnasium of Computer Science and The Gymnasium of Philology. There are plans for an integrated entrance exam for higher education, as well as unified scoring systems for entrance exams, even for special gymnasiums.

Gymnasiums have its courses (smerovi), and the most common ones are the General Course, Science-Mathematics Course, Humanities-Linguistics Course, Information Technology Course and the Bilingual Course. Students can only choose one course (they do it when they write their wish list for preferred schools and courses) and they usually don't change it until they graduate. Every course has the same number and list of classes, but the difference is in their schedules (for example, the Humanities-Linguistic Course might have English classes five times a week, while the Science-Mathematics Course offers two English classes a week).

Gymnasium Curriculum 
Subjects taught at Serbian gymnasiums and the number of 45-min classes per week depending on the course:

Professional schools 

Professional schools (stručna škola) specializes students in a particular field and awards them with a First Professional Degree. It also takes four years to complete. Some examples of such schools are Economy School, Medical School, Chemistry School, Technical School, Graphics School, etc.

Professional schools also have courses. Usually, they teach 10-14 general subjects (Serbian, mathematics, geography, biology, history, foreign language etc.), a few professional subjects that are different for almost every course (hygiene in a nurse-technician course at medical schools, for example) and a compulsory block of practice classes.

There are two types of professional school courses: four-year courses and three-year courses. Three-year courses are crafts and if a student that has a craft diploma wants to attend a university, they must enroll in the fourth year of a four-year course inordinately.

Also, after graduating from professional schools, students are given particular ranks. If their school course was "Law", then their rank is the Law Technician. Only four-year courses give ranks.

Grading system 
The grading system is numeric and is present in this form through elementary school and high school. Grades from 1 (the lowest and failing grade) to 5 (the best grade) are used for primary and high schools:

 Insufficient (1) corresponds to American F
 Sufficient (2) corresponds to American D and C
 Good (3) corresponds to American C and B grades
 Very good (4) corresponds to American B+ and A− grades
 Excellent (5) corresponds to American A and A+ grades

Higher schools and universities use grades from 5 to 10. All students have to acquire at least 6 (the lowest passing grade). Grades for the 1st grade of primary school are 'descriptive' (teacher writes down the impressions about the particular student and particular subjects).

Free Textbooks 
Every subject (except PE) has its own textbook (students aren't obliged to have all textbooks). Textbooks are chosen by the teachers of the particular school, and they are bought in the local bookstore, or as second-hand (from those who passed the particular grade).

As of school year 2009–2010, all 1st grade primary school students are granted textbooks for free, provided they return them at the end of school year "usable". However, even "unusable" (damaged) books are accepted, and no-one is fined, as minister Žarko Obradović said.

Free textbooks in higher grades were only available for poor students in the past, but now students in Belgrade get their textbooks free of charge but are bound to return them at the end of the school year.

Foreigners and the stateless 
Foreign citizens and stateless students are enrolled on the same principle as Serbian citizens are. The only difference is that they are provided free Serbian classes (in case they don't already know Serbian) prior to enrollment so they could understand lectures in school. If the student is from a European country, they can be provided the lectures of mother tongue and culture, free or with compensation.

Students' health 
All students have to submit their medical report when proceeding to every grade with an odd number. A psychologist's report is also needed if enrolling in primary school. Compulsory vaccinations, physical examinations and dental checkups are carried out in schools for free. Also, during compulsory school running races and similar events, medical teams are always present.

Facilities 
Primary schools can have cafeterias which provide students with meals for the lowest price. They offer mostly croissants with the filling, but some have hamburgers, french fries and more. Some schools offer cooked meals, but their cost is much higher. Excursions (ekskurzija) are one- or two-day trips to places around Serbia and Europe and are organized by the particular school and only in primary and high schools. Supplementary education is carried out for students with aspirations of learning more about the particular subject, participate in competitions, earn scholarships and prepare for further education. Complementary education is carried out for students with bad grades. Its goals are to help students catch up with lectures, not with learning lesson only for the test, but also with remembering core part of that lesson for longer. It can also be attended by students with higher grades, especially as a preparation for the upcoming test.

Higher education

Tertiary education 

The school year starts on September 1st and ends on May 31st and it is split into two semesters. There are six regular exam blocks every school year and several irregular ones which are different for every college or university. 

Tertiary level institutions accept students based on their grades in high school and entrance exams results. 

 College or 'Higher School' (viša škola) lasts for 3 years. In Serbia, it corresponds to professional universities. After graduating from college, students get a bachelor's degree in Applied Sciences or an equivalent diploma. 
 Faculties (fakultet) of universities (univerzitet) and art academies (akademija umetnosti) last for 4 years until baccalaureate, 5 years until magistracy and 8 years until doctorate. Only exception are the Medical schools, lasting for 6 years until Doctor of Medicine.

Serbia has 17 universities, of which 8 are public and 9 are private, 63 colleges of applied sciences, of which 47 are public and 17 are private, and 8 colleges of academic studies, of which 3 are public and 5 are private. 

Serbian citizens can study at public universities for free, while tuition is low for foreign students. Tuition costs at private schools vary.

Quaternary education 
Postgraduate education (post-diplomske studije) was made of further specialization and doctorate during the times of Socialist Yugoslavia. However, the Bologna Process (which Serbia signed in 2003) abolished the quaternary education and incorporated it into the tertiary education. Specialization today is non-academic and considered as improvement in different parts of the profession (seminars, researches, etc.), and doctorate is considered as the third part of the bachelor-master-doctor continuum present in the tertiary educational system.

Special education 
Special education includes: education of disabled, bilingual education, full-day classes and adult education. It is implemented only for primary and secondary education.

Education of disabled is handled both in ordinary schools and special schools.

As of school year 2009–2010, higher grade primary school students and high school students can be organized into special classes, which are based on bilingual education (dvojezička/bilingvalna nastava). Children are taught on Serbian and either English, French or Italian.

As of school year 2009–2010, full-day classes (celodnevna nastava) are held. They are designed for children with busy parents. They are organized only for lower grades of primary schools. Children have morning classes, afternoon classes and breaks for play, homework, lunch etc. They have separate teachers for separate shifts. This gives students possibility to be in school for the longest part of the day with their classmates and do all the homework and other school obligations at school.

Full-day classes are the extension of already present 'extended stay' (produženi boravak), which allows students to stay at school after the morning shift (typically ending at noon) until their parents come home from work (typically 3-5 pm). Schools offering full-day classes also offer 'extended stay'.

As of school year 2011–2012, adult education was launched under the name Druga šansa (Second chance). Its purpose is to educate people who didn't graduate primary or high school or both, so they could have better chances of getting a work. Most people attending adult education are minors who missed their chance to enroll in primary schools (most of them being of Roma descent).

Academic degrees

Primary and Secondary School 
 Osnovnoškolsko svedočanstvo (Primary school testimony; after 8 years of primary school) → 8 years of education
 Trogodišnja stručna diploma (First professional degree; after 3 years of professional school) → 11 (8+3) years of education
 Četvorogodišnja stručna diploma (First professional degree; after 4 years of professional school) → 12 (8+4) years of education
 Gimnazijska diploma (Gymnasium diploma; after 4 years of gymnasium) → 12 (8+4) years of education

Colleges 
 Bachelor's Degree in Applied Sciences; after 3 years of college or higher school. 180 ECTS are needed for the degree.

Non-Medical University 
 Diploma visoke škole (Bachelor's degree): Bachelor (180 ECTS), after 3 years of university studies → 15 (8+4+3) years of education; Bachelor with honours (diploma fakulteta) (240 ECTS), after 4 years of university studies → 16 (8+4+4) years of education.
 Specijalistički master (Professional master's degree; after 4 years of Universities of applied studies) → 16 (8+4+4) years of education
 Magistratura/master (Master's degree; after 5 years of university studies) → 17 (8+4+5) years of education
 Doktorat (Doctorate/PhD; after 3 years of doctoral studies) → 20 (8+4+5+3) years of education

Medical schools 
 Doktor medicine (Doctor of Medicine (MD); after 6 years of medical studies) → 18 (8+4+6) years of education
 Medicinska specijalnost (Medical specialty (MD/Spec); after 5 years of medical specialization) → 23 (8+4+6+5) years of education
 Doktorat medicinskih nauka (Medical doctorate (MD-PhD); after 6 years of doctoral specialization) → 24 (8+4+6+6) years of education

Education organization

Multilateral agreements 
 International Convention on the Recognition of Studies and Degrees in the Arab and European States on the Mediterranean (2001)
 Unesco Convention On the Recognition of Studies and Degrees Concerning Higher Education in the Europe Region (2001)
 Bologna Process (2003) Implemented from school year 2005–2006, it altered the tertiary and abolished quaternary education.
 Convention on the Recognition of Qualifications concerning Higher Education in the Europe Region (2004)

Gallery

See also
Teacher's Training College of Kruševac

References